The Power and the Glory is a 1940 novel by British author Graham Greene. The title is an allusion to the doxology often recited at the end of the Protestants' Lord's Prayer: "For thine is the kingdom, the power, and the glory, forever and ever, amen." It was initially published in the United States under the title The Labyrinthine Ways.

Greene's novel tells the story of a renegade Catholic 'whisky priest' (a term coined by Greene) living in the Mexican state of Tabasco in the 1930s, a time when the Mexican government was attempting to suppress the Catholic Church. That suppression had resulted in the Cristero War (1927–1929), so named for its Catholic combatants' slogan "Viva Cristo Rey ("Long live Christ the King").

In 1941, the novel received the Hawthornden Prize British literary award. In 2005, it was chosen by TIME magazine as one of the hundred best English-language novels since 1923.

Plot
The main character is an unnamed 'whisky priest', who combines a great power for self-destruction with pitiful cravenness, an almost painful penitence, and a desperate quest for dignity. By the end, though, the priest "acquires a real holiness." The other principal character is a police lieutenant tasked with hunting down this priest. This Lieutenant – also unnamed but thought to be based upon Tomás Garrido Canabal – is a committed socialist who despises the Church.

The overall situation is this: Catholicism is outlawed in Mexico. However, while the other states of Mexico seem to follow a Don't-ask-don't-tell policy, the state of Tabasco enforces the ban rigorously. Mexico, or at least Tabasco, is ruled on socialist grounds, and priests have either been settled by the state with wives (breaking celibacy) and pensions in exchange for their renouncing the faith and being strictly banned from fulfilling priestly functions (such as one Padre José), or else have left the state or are on the run, or have been shot. The story starts with the arrival of the main character in a small country town and then follows him on his trip through Tabasco, where he tries to minister to the people as best he can. In doing so, he is faced by a lot of problems, not least of which is that Tabasco is also prohibitionist, with the unspoken prime objective to hinder celebration of the Sacrifice of the Mass, for which actual wine is an essential. It is, therefore, quite easy to get, say, brandy or tequila, despite it being forbidden, but very difficult to get wine. He is also haunted by his personal problems and past and present sins, especially by the fact that he fathered a child in his parish some years before; additionally, his use of spirits may be bordering on addiction and certainly is beyond the limit of good measure in his own view. (In one scene, both of these problems are mixed: the protagonist tries to procure a bottle of wine for Holy Mass, needing to go to very high officials to do so, with an additional bottle of brandy for cover and also for his personal use. Not being able to reveal himself, and eager to appear friendly, he agrees to share his wine with the official, all of which is then consumed while in vain he tries to offer the brandy instead. He eventually leaves with only partial bottle of brandy, and no wine. 

As for his daughter, he meets her, but is unable to feel repentant about what happened. Rather, he feels a deep love for the evil-looking and awkward little girl and decides to do everything in his power to save her from damnation. During his journey the priest also encounters a mestizo who later reveals himself to be a Judas figure. The chief antagonist, however, is the lieutenant, who is morally irreproachable, yet cold and inhumane. While he is supposedly "living for the people", he puts into practice a diabolic plan of taking hostages from villages and shooting them, if it proves that the priest has sojourned in a village but is not denounced. The lieutenant has also had bad experiences with the church in his youth, and as a result there is a personal element in his search for the whisky priest. The lieutenant thinks that all members of the clergy are fundamentally evil, and believes that the church is corrupt, and does nothing but provide delusion to the people.

In his flight from the lieutenant and his posse, the priest escapes into a neighbouring province, only to re-connect with the mestizo, who persuades the priest to return to hear the confession of a dying man. Though the priest suspects that it is a trap, he feels compelled to fulfil his priestly duty. Although he finds the dying man, it is a trap and the lieutenant captures the priest. The lieutenant admits he has nothing against the priest as a man, but he must be shot "as a danger". On the eve of the execution, the lieutenant shows mercy and attempts to enlist Padre José to hear the condemned man's confession (which in extremis the Church would allow, and which the protagonist has agreed to), but the effort is thwarted by Padre José's wife. The lieutenant is convinced that he has "cleared the province of priests". In the final scene, however, another priest arrives in the town. One faithful Catholic woman we had previously encountered telling lives of the saints in the underground has added the life of the protagonist to her repertoire, while forbidding her son to ever remember that this priest smelled strangely out of his mouth. This, among other possible readings, suggests that the Catholic Church cannot be destroyed. On a lighter level, it also suggests that a certain type of devotee will ever try to smooth down rough-edged saints into Fairchild family-like picturebook heroes, even if it stands in the way of properly celebrating their very real faith and heroism.

Composition
Greene visited Mexico from January to May 1938 to research and write a nonfiction account of the persecution of the Catholic Church in Mexico, that he had been planning since 1936. The persecution of the Catholic Church was especially severe in the province of Tabasco, under anti-clerical governor Tomás Garrido Canabal. His campaign succeeded in closing all the churches in the state. It forced the priests to marry and give up their soutanes. Greene called it the "fiercest persecution of religion anywhere since the reign of Elizabeth." He chronicled his travels in Tabasco in The Lawless Roads, published in 1939. In that generally hostile account of his visit he wrote "That, I think, was the day I began to hate the Mexicans" and at another point described his "growing depression, almost pathological hatred ... for Mexico." Pico Iyer has marveled at how Greene's responses to what he saw could be "so dyspeptic, so loveless, so savagely self-enclosed and blind" in his nonfiction treatment of his journey, though, as another critic has noted, "nowhere in The Power and the Glory is there any indication of the testiness and revulsion" in Greene's nonfiction report. Many details reported in Greene's nonfiction treatment of his Tabasco trip appeared in the novel, from the sound of a revolver in the police chief's holster to the vultures in the sky. The principal characters of The Power and the Glory all have antecedents in The Lawless Roads, mostly as people Greene encountered directly or, in the most important instance, a legendary character that people told him about, a certain "whisky priest", a fugitive who, as Greene writes in The Lawless Roads, "existed for ten years in the forest and swamps, venturing out only at night".

Another of Greene's inspirations for his main character was the Jesuit priest Miguel Pro, who performed his priestly functions as an underground priest in Tabasco and was executed without trial in 1927 on false charges.

In 1983, Greene said that he first started to become a Christian in Tabasco, where the fidelity of the peasants "assumed such proportions that I couldn't help being profoundly moved."

Despite having visited Mexico and published an account of his travels, in the novel Greene was not meticulous about Tabasco's geography. In The Power and the Glory, he identified the region's northern border as another Mexican state and its southern border as the sea, when Tabasco's northern border is actually the Bay of Campeche and its southern border is Chiapas to the south.

Characters
The Priest: The unnamed main character in the novel, the priest is on the run from the authorities, who will kill him if they catch him. A "whisky priest", and not the finest example of his profession, he is an alcoholic who has also fathered a child. In his younger days he was smug and self-satisfied. Now as a fugitive, he feels guilt for his mistakes and sins. Nevertheless, he continues to perform his priestly functions (often in great difficulty and sometimes reluctance) and it is his determination to attend to the spiritual needs of a dying man that leads to his eventual capture and death.

The Lieutenant: The lieutenant is the chief adversary of the priest. He hates the church because he thinks it is corrupt, and he pursues the priest ruthlessly. He takes hostages from the villages and kills them when he feels it is necessary. However, the lieutenant is also idealistic, and believes in radical social reform that would end poverty and provide education for everyone. He is capable of acts of personal kindness, as when he gives the priest (whom he believes to be a destitute drunkard) money on leaving the jail.

The Mestizo: The mestizo is the half-Indian peasant who insists on guiding the priest to Carmen. The priest knows that the mestizo will at some point hand him over to the authorities in exchange for a reward. The mestizo encounters the priest again in the prison, but prefers to wait for the right moment to betray him, which he does when leading him to the dying American.

Maria: Maria is the mother of Brigitta, the priest’s daughter. She keeps brandy for the priest and helps him evade the police when they come to her village looking for him. Although she shows support when the "whisky priest" reappears, the narrative leaves the character of Maria incomplete with implications of resentment.

Brigitta: The young daughter of Maria and the priest.

Padre José: A priest who obeyed the government’s instructions and took a wife. He is dominated by her and has lost both the respect of the town and his self-respect. He refuses to do any priestly duties, even when people beg him to, because he fears the authorities.

Mr. Tench: Mr. Tench is a dissatisfied English dentist who longs to return from Mexico to England. He befriends the priest, whom he meets at the quayside, and later witnesses his death.

Coral Fellows: The thirteen-year-old daughter of Captain and Mrs. Fellows. She befriends the priest and offers refuge to him for the future. Her fate at the end of the novel is not revealed. Her parents have promised each other not to talk about her again.

Captain Fellows: A happy Englishman who works on a banana plantation who is displeased to find that the priest has taken refuge in his barn.

Mrs. Fellows: The wife of Captain Fellows. She is neurotic and fearful and hates life in Mexico.

The Woman: The unnamed woman reads to her children the story of Juan and his martyrdom. The Catholic faith is important to her and she wants her children to take an interest in it.

Luis: This young boy shows little interest in the story his mother reads to him, but his interest is awakened by the news of the priest's death.

The Gringo: An American fugitive called James Calver, he is wanted for murder and bank robbery.

The Chief of Police: Mostly concerned with playing billiards and assuaging his own toothache, he doesn't share the Lieutenant's idealism and wilfully breaks the law.

The Lehrs: Mr. Lehr, a widower, and his sister, Miss Lehr, are an elderly couple who allow the priest to stay with them after he crosses the state border. They are Lutherans, and have little sympathy for Catholicism, although they treat the priest with kindness.

Juan: Juan is a character within a story that the unnamed woman reads to her family. Juan is a young Mexican man who enters the priesthood, lives a pious life and faces his death by firing squad with great courage.

Adaptations
In 1947, the novel was freely adapted into a film, The Fugitive, directed by John Ford and starring Henry Fonda as the priest. It was faithfully dramatized by Denis Cannan for performance at the Phoenix Theatre in London in 1956, the whisky priest acted by Paul Scofield, and in 1958 at the Phoenix Theatre in New York City. The dramatization was The Play of the Week on US television in 1959, with James Donald as the priest. A highly acclaimed 1961 US television version, released theatrically overseas, featured Laurence Olivier in the role.

Criticism
The Power and the Glory was somewhat controversial and, in 1953, Cardinal Bernard Griffin of Westminster summoned Greene and read him a pastoral letter condemning the novel. According to Greene:The Archbishop of Westminster read me a letter from the Holy Office condemning my novel because it was "paradoxical" and "dealt with extraordinary circumstances." The price of liberty, even within a Church, is eternal vigilance, but I wonder whether any of the totalitarian states ... would have treated me as gently when I refused to revise the book on the casuistical ground that the copyright was in the hands of my publishers. There was no public condemnation, and the affair was allowed to drop into that peaceful oblivion which the Church wisely reserves for unimportant issues.

Evelyn Waugh in Greene's defence wrote, "It was as fatuous as unjust – a vile misreading of a noble book." Greene said that when he met Pope Paul VI in 1965, he assured Greene, "some aspects of your books are certain to offend some Catholics, but you should pay no attention to that." Many novelists consider the novel to be Greene's masterpiece, as John Updike claimed in his introduction to the 1990 reprint of the novel. On its publication, William Golding claimed Greene had "captured the conscience of the twentieth century man like no other."

See also
Red Shirts (Mexico)

Notes

References

External links
 

1940 British novels
British novels adapted into films
Novels by Graham Greene
Novels set in Mexico
Catholic novels
Novels about alcoholism
Memoirs about alcoholism
Hawthornden Prize-winning works
Catholicism in fiction
Heinemann (publisher) books